There are around 88 villages in Jamkhed tehsil of Ahmednagar district of state of Maharashtra. Following is the list of village in Jamkhed tehsil.

A
 Agi
 Anadwadi
 Apti
 Arangaon
 Amlaner

B
 Balgahvan
 Bandhkhadak
 Bavi
 Borle
 Bhutawda
 Barhanpur
Bhogalwadi

C
 Chobhewadi
 Chondi

D
 Deodaithan
 Dhamangaon
 Dhanegaon
 Dhanora
 Dhondpargaon
 Dighol
 Dongaon (Warewasti)
 Disalewadi

F
 Fakrabad

G
 Ghodegaon
 Gurewadi
 Girawali

H
 Halgaon

J
 Jamkhed
 Jamadarwadi 
 jamwadi
 
 Jategaon vishnu ankush

 Jawala
 Jawalke
 Jaybhaywadi
 Jamkhed Ru.
 Rukhmina mapari

K
 Kawadgaon
 Khandvi
 Kharda
 Khurdaithan
 Kusadgaon
 Kadbhanwadi
 Kolhewadi

L
 Loni

M
 Matewadi
 Moha
 Mohari
 Mungewadi
 Munjewadi

N
 Nahuli
 Nannaj
 Nanewadi
 Naigaon

P
 Padali
 Pimpalgaon Alwa
 Pimpagoan Unda
 Pimparkhed
 Potewadi
 Patoda

R
 Rajewadi
 Rajuri
 Ratnapur

S
 Sakat
 Sarola
 Satefal
 Sawargaon
 Shiur
 Sonegaon

T
 Taradgaon
 Telangshi

W
 Wagha
 Waki

Z
 Zikri

See also
 Jamkhed tehsil
 Tehsils in Ahmednagar
 Villages in Akole tehsil
 Villages in Karjat tehsil
 Villages in Kopargaon tehsil
 Villages in Nagar tehsil
 Villages in Nevasa tehsil
 Villages in Parner tehsil
 Villages in Pathardi tehsil
 Villages in Rahata tehsil
 Villages in Rahuri tehsil
 Villages in Sangamner tehsil
 Villages in Shevgaon tehsil
 Villages in Shrigonda tehsil
 Villages in Shrirampur tehsil

References

 
Jamkhed